Priya Manickchand is a Guyanese politician. She is holding the position of Minister of Education in Guyana. She was appointed Minister of Education on August 5, 2020, by President Irfaan Ali.

References 

Living people
Members of the National Assembly (Guyana)
Year of birth missing (living people)
Government ministers of Guyana
Women government ministers of Guyana
Guyanese people of Indian descent